Chinese Public Administration Society (CPAS) is a nationwide academic institution, whose vocation is specialized in the research of administrative theories and practices, development of administrative sciences and promoting public services.

CPAS organizes research personnel engaged in administrative management throughout the country, and the relevant academic organizations and scientific research and teaching units. CPAS learns and uses the experiences of administrative management and sciences from other countries in the world, and promotes academic exchanges concerning administrative sciences with other countries. In addition, CPAS participates in international academic organizations and conducts foreign exchanges on behalf of the Chinese administrative circles.

The National Members’ Congress of the CPAS is the highest organ of its power. The council members of the CPAS are elected at the National Members’ Congress of the CPAS. The executive council members, chairman, vice-chairmen and secretary-general are elected at the CPAS Council Meeting. CPAS receives professional instructions and supervision of General Office of the State Council and Administration Center for Civil Institution Registration of the Ministry of Civil Affairs.

See also
China National School of Administration
List of public administration schools
School of Political Science and Public Administration, University of Electronic Science and Technology of China UESTC 
School of Public Administration, Renmin University (external)
Department of Political Science and Public Administration Zhong Shan (SunYat-Sen) University
Chinese Public Administration Review - external, American Society for Public Administration

References
International Conference on Government Management Innovation,Guangdong,China

External links
Official website
The Development of the Chinese Public Administration Society  Chinese Public Administration Review, volume 1, number 1
International Conference on Public Administration
Hong Kong Public Administration Association
The 3rd Sino-US International Conference for Public Administration
Public Administration Training  (more information)
United Nations Public Administration Network
ASPA Builds Bridges with Chinese Public Administration Community
Teaching Public Administration in China

Public administration
Professional associations based in China